Cassandra Imploring The Vengeance of Minerva Against Ajax (1810) or French Cassandre implorant la vengeance de Minerve contre Ajax is an oil-on-canvas painting by Jérôme-Martin Langlois.

History
Langlois painted Cassandre implorant la vengeance de Minerve contre Ajax in 1810. The painting was exhibited at the 1817 Salon (Paris) and earned a second-class medal there. Louis XVIII bought the painting after the salon.

Description
The painting depicts Cassandra, having been raped by Ajax the Lesser, looking to the heavens and seeking revenge. The setting is the fall of Troy and Cassandra is seated in the temple of Minerva. Her hands are behind her back and she leans on the altar. In the background, Troy can be seen in flames, and a woman can be seen struggling with a soldier.

Legacy
An image of the painting appears on the cover Emily Pillinger's 2019 book, Cassandra and the poetics of prophecy in Greek and Latin literature.

References

1810 paintings
Paintings by Jérôme-Martin Langlois
Neoclassical paintings